Delik-e Tayebi (also Romanized as Delīk-e Ţayebī) is a village in Tayebi-ye Sarhadi-ye Sharqi Rural District, Charusa District, Kohgiluyeh County, Kohgiluyeh and Boyer-Ahmad Province, Iran. At the 2006 census, its population was 32, in 8 families.

References 

Populated places in Kohgiluyeh County